Touching Evil is a British television drama serial following the exploits of a crack squad on the Organised & Serial Crime Unit, a rapid response police force that serves the entire country.

The serial was produced by United Productions for Anglia Television, and screened on the ITV network in 1997. It was created by Paul Abbott. The first season consists of six 50-minute (one-hour with advertisements) episodes written by Abbott with Russell T Davies. The popularity of the serial led to two sequel serials in 1998 and 1999, although not written by Abbott or Davies. The first episode aired on 29 April 1997, and the last on 6 June 1999, after 16 episodes and 3 series.

The serial stars Robson Green as D.I. Dave Creegan, with Nicola Walker co-starring as his colleague D.I. Susan Taylor. The third series was co-produced by Green's own independent production company Coastal Productions.

Cast

Main cast
Robson Green as D.I. Dave Creegan (series 1–3; 16 episodes)
Nicola Walker as D.I. Susan Taylor (series 1–3; 16 episodes)
Shaun Dingwall as D.C. Mark Rivers (series 1–3; 14 episodes)
Michael Feast as Commander Stephen Enwright (series 1–3; 15 episodes)
Mary Cunningham as Police Psychologist Marion (series 1–2; 11 episodes)
Adam Kotz as D.C. Jonathan Kreitman (series 1; 6 episodes)
Andrew Scarborough as D.C. Martin Simmons (series 3; 2 episodes)

Recurring cast
Saskia Downes as Kerry Creegan (7 episodes)
Antony Byrne as Barry (7 episodes)
Holly Earl as Louise Creegan (7 episodes)
Molly Moloney as Ruby Creegan (7 episodes)
John Duttine as Michael Hawkins (4 episodes)
Kenneth MacDonald as Cyril (4 episodes)
Sean Gilder as Steve Carroll (4 episodes)

Episodes

Series Overview

Series 1 (1997)

Series 2 (1998)

Series 3 (1999)

References

External links

Touching Evil at Robson Green's website

ITV television dramas
1990s British drama television series
1997 British television series debuts
1999 British television series endings
Television series by ITV Studios
English-language television shows
1990s British crime television series
Television shows produced by Anglia Television